Ygapema boliviana is a species of beetle in the family Cerambycidae. It was described by Belon in 1899.

References

Clytini
Beetles described in 1899